Squamarina is a genus of lichens in the family Stereocaulaceae, although it has recently been suggested that it may belong in the family Ramalinaceae. They form patches of radiating lobes or overlapping scales, with a well-developed upper cortex and no lower cortex.  They grow on calcareous soil and rocks.  Squamarina lentigera can be used to make a yellow dye.

References

Stereocaulaceae
Lichen genera
Lecanorales genera
Taxa described in 1958
Taxa named by Josef Poelt